The 2007–08 Taça da Liga was the first edition of the Taça da Liga, also known as Carlsberg Cup for sponsorship reasons.

For the first round (4 and 5 August), only teams competing in the Liga de Honra participated. In the second round (12 August), Primeira Liga teams entered.

The competition was won by Vitória de Setúbal, who defeated Sporting CP 3–2 in the penalty shootout after a goalless draw at the Estádio Algarve, Faro.

First round

Drawing
Teams had been distributed by two pots, being based on the position of the previous championship.
 Pot A (away):
 Beira-Mar and Desportivo das Aves, who were relegated from the top division;
 3rd to 8th position of the 2006–07 Liga de Honra.
 Pot B (home):
 9th to 14th position of the 2006–07 Liga de Honra;
 Fátima and Freamunde, who were promoted from II Divisão.

Games

 (LH) - Liga de Honra

Games results in detail

Second round

Drawing
Teams were divided for two pots, one with the lower ranked Portuguese Liga teams and the other with the first round winners, who played at home.

 Pot C (home):
 winners teams of first round;
 Pot D (visitors):
 9th to 14th placed teams of the 2006–07 Primeira Liga, and the 1st and 2nd placed teams of the 2006–07 Liga de Honra (Leixões and Vitória de Guimarães) ;

 (LH) – Liga de Honra 
 (PL) – Primeira League

Games

 (LH) – Liga de Honra 

 (PL) – Primeira League

Games results in detail

Third round

Drawing
Teams were divided in two pots, one with the higher ranked Portuguese Liga teams and the other with the second round winners, who played at home.
Pot E (home):
winners teams of Second round;
Pot F (visitors):
1st to 8th placed teams of the 2006–07 Primeira Liga

Games

 (LH) – Liga de Honra 

 (PL) – Primeira League

Games results in details

Fourth round

The winning teams of the third round will be in only one pot and will play in two legs.

 LH – Liga de Honra 
 PL – Primeira Liga

Games

 (LH) – Liga de Honra 

 (PL) – Primeira League

First leg

Second leg

Fifth round

The four winners from the fourth round will play in a group stage with a single round-robin format. The teams that finish first and second in the group will advance to play each other in the final.

Games results in detail

Final

Coin toss determined Vitória to be the first on the penalty shootout series.
Except for Jorginho's shot at his right post (inner side), all other shots were saved by the goalkeepers.

External links
 Official website - Liga Portuguesa de Futebol Profissional

2007-08
2007–08 European domestic association football cups
Taca da Liga